Yakubu Mohammed (born 7 June 1996) is a Ghanaian professional footballer who plays as a defender for the Tanzanian club Azam. He represents the Ghana national team.

Career
Mohammed began his career in Ghana with Red Bull Ghana, D'International and Ashanti Gold. He moved to Morocco in 2015 with Union Aït Melloul and Raja Casablanca, before returning to Ghana with Aduana Stars. He moved to Tanzania in 2016 with Azam.

International career
Mohammed made his debut with the Ghana national team in a 2–1 2015 COSAFA Cup win over Madagascar on 25 May 2015.

References

External links

NFT Profile

1996 births
Living people
Footballers from Accra
Ghanaian footballers
Ghana international footballers
Association football defenders
Red Bull Ghana players
Ashanti Gold SC players
Raja CA players
Aduana Stars F.C. players
Azam F.C. players
Ghana Premier League players
Botola players
Ghanaian expatriate footballers
Ghanaian expatriates in Morocco
Ghanaian expatriate sportspeople in Tanzania
Expatriate footballers in Morocco
Expatriate footballers in Tanzania